The Bui National Park is found in Ghana. It was established in 1971. This site is 1821km². It is located in a typical woodland savanna zone. The reserve is notable for its large Hippopotamus population in the Black Volta. The endangered black and white colobus monkey and a variety of antelopes and birds are also present. Part of the park has been inundated by the reservoir of the Bui Dam, which was constructed from 2007 to 2013.

Location
Bui National Park is bisected by the Black Volta River; the section on the West of the river forms part of the Bono region and the section on the East of the river forms part of the Savannah Region of Ghana. The park borders Ivory Coast on the West. The closest towns are Nsawkaw, Wenchi and Techiman.

References

National parks of Ghana
Volta River
1971 establishments in Ghana
Protected areas established in 1971